The Parish Church of St Gallus and Ulrich is a Roman Catholic church in Kißlegg, Germany. It was built in 1734-1738 by Johann Georg Fischer through the conversion of a Gothic church predecessor. It was extensively renovated between 1974 and 1980. The church contains a Madonna of 1623 (attributed to Hans Zürn the Elder), a baroque pulpit of divination Johann Wilhelm (1745) and numerous tombs of the 16th and 17th century. The church also has a valuable treasure of silver (1741-1755) from the workshop of the Augsburg silversmith Franz Christoph Mäderl.

The church also contains a purported relic of Saint Clemens that is in fact an example of a so-called catacomb saint, a corpse that has been taken from the Roman Catacombs, decorated, given a fictitious name, and presented as the relic of a Roman Catholic saint.

Roman Catholic churches in Baden-Württemberg
Buildings and structures in Ravensburg (district)